Sir Walter James Young KBE (2 April 1872 – 5 January 1940) was an Australian businessman.

Walter James Young was the son of John Young, a pastoralist, and was born at Moonta, South Australia. He was educated at Whinham College and obtained a position with Elder Smith and Company at Adelaide in 1897. His energy and ability soon marked him out for promotion and 25 years later, at the early age of 40, he became general manager of the company. In 1929 he was appointed managing-director. Though well known in business circles Young did not come into public notice until the 1914–18 war, when he was a member of the Commonwealth shipping board, and vice-chairman of the Commonwealth central wool committee. In 1917 he went on a special mission to the United States for the British government. In 1920 he was chairman of the London committee which carried out negotiations with the British government relating to Australian Wool carry-over, and he was also a member of the advisory committee of the Australian Wheat Board. In 1923 Young was a member of the committee of inter-Imperial exchanges at the Imperial economic conference held at London, and showed himself to be a man of wide knowledge.

From this time onwards Young's opinions were much valued by state and federal governments. He was chairman of a special committee appointed by the South Australian government in 1927 to advise on the state finances. Again in 1930 he was chairman of the advisory committee to advise in connexion with the depression. He was able to resign in 1932 having recommended that South Australia should fall in with the "premiers' plan". He was a director of various companies, a member of the council of the University of Adelaide from 1924, and was chairman of the South Australian branch of the Council for Scientific and Industrial Research. He was created CBE in 1918 and KBE in 1932.

See also

 Frederick William Young
 Richard Layton Butler
 Lionel Laughton Hill

References

1872 births
1940 deaths
Australian Knights Commander of the Order of the British Empire
Australian businesspeople
People from Moonta, South Australia